Brookea is a genus of flowering plant belonging to the family Plantaginaceae.

Its native range is Borneo to Sulawesi.

Species:

Brookea albicans 
Brookea auriculata 
Brookea celebica 
Brookea dasyantha 
Brookea linduensis 
Brookea tomentosa

References

Plantaginaceae
Plantaginaceae genera